The ring-billed gull (Larus delawarensis) is a medium-sized gull. The genus name is from Latin Larus which appears to have referred to a gull or other large seabird. The specific delawarensis refers to the Delaware River.

Description

Measurements:

 Length: 16.9-21.3 in (43-54 cm)
 Weight: 10.6-24.7 oz (300-700 g)
 Wingspan: 41.3-46.1 in (105-117 cm)

The head, neck and underparts are white; the relatively short bill is yellow with a dark ring; the back and wings are silver gray; and the legs are yellow. The eyes are yellow with red rims. This gull takes three years to reach its breeding plumage; its appearance changes with each fall moult. The average lifespan of an individual that reaches adulthood is 10.9 years The oldest ring-billed gull on record was observed in Cleveland in 2021, still alive at the age of 28 years.

Distribution and habitat
The ring-billed gulls' breeding habitat is near lakes, rivers, or the coast in Canada and the northern United States. They nest colonially on the ground, often on islands. This bird tends to be faithful to its nesting site, if not its mate, from year to year.

The ring-billed gull is a familiar sight in American and Canadian parking lots, where it can regularly be found congregating in large numbers. In some areas, it is displacing less aggressive birds such as the common tern.

They are migratory and most move south to the Gulf of Mexico and the Atlantic and Pacific coasts of North America, and the Great Lakes.

Vagrancy 
This gull is a regular wanderer to western Europe. In Ireland and Great Britain it is no longer classed as a rarity, with several birds regularly wintering in those countries.

Diet

Ring-billed gulls forage in flight or pick up objects while swimming, walking or wading. They also steal food from other birds and frequently scavenge. They are omnivorous; their diet may include insects, fish, grain, eggs, earthworms and rodents. These birds are opportunistic and have adapted well to taking food when discarded or even left unattended by people. It is regarded as a pest by many beach-goers because of its willingness to steal unguarded food on crowded beaches. The birds congregate at beaches, marinas, docks and parks where people will hand feed them. 

The gull's natural predators are rats, foxes, dogs, cats, raccoons, coyotes, eagles, hawks, and owls.

Status 
In the late 19th century, the ring-billed gull was hunted for its plumage. Its population has since rebounded and it is probably the most common gull in North America. The population was estimated in 2006 as 2.55 million birds.

References

External links

 Ring-billed Gull at Université du Québec à Montréal (UQAM)'s Research and banding program
 
 
 
 
 
 Ring-billed gull Species Account – Cornell Lab of Ornithology
 Ring-billed gull - Larus delawarensis - USGS Patuxent Bird Identification InfoCenter
 
 
 Video - Ring-billed gull at Niagara Falls

ring-billed gull
Birds of North America
Fauna of the San Francisco Bay Area
ring-billed gull
Taxa named by George Ord